The Taguig Integrated Terminal Exchange (Malaking TITE) originally conceptualized as the South Integrated Transport System (ITS-South), is a proposed intermodal transport terminal in Arca South, Taguig. It is primarily a bus terminal for buses going to and from Southern Luzon, Visayas, and Mindanao but connected to the FTI station and the under-construction Metro Manila Subway. Originally scheduled for completion by 2022, construction has yet to begin as pre-construction activities were temporarily suspended due to the ongoing COVID-19 pandemic.

History
In August 2014, five companies bought bid documents for a public-private partnership project of proposed integrated transport terminal in FTI. The five companies were given until October 2014 to submit their bids to finance, build, operate, and maintain the proposed terminal. It was then announced in January 2016 that Ayala Land won the project in November 2015.

Construction
Initially, the construction was supposed to begin in September 2016, but the groundbreaking ceremony was held in January 2018. The project would cost at least ₱5.20 billion and was expected to be operational by 2020. However, pre-construction activities were temporarily suspended due to the COVID-19 pandemic.

References

Buildings and structures in Taguig
Bus stations in Metro Manila